H. gouldii may refer to:
 Hapalotis gouldii, a moth species in the genus Hapalotis
 Heintzichthys gouldii, an extinct placoderm fish species that lived what is now Europe and North America during the Late Devonian
 Hydrosaurus gouldii, a sailfin lizard species in the genus Hydrosaurus

See also
 Gouldii (disambiguation)